Mary Leader (born 1948 Pawnee, Oklahoma) is a poet, and former assistant attorney general of Oklahoma.

Life
She graduated from the University of Oklahoma in 1975, with a J.D. in 1980, from Warren Wilson College with a M.F.A. in 1991, and from Brandeis University with a Ph.D. in 2000.  She taught at Warren Wilson College, Emory University, Louisiana State University, the University of Memphis, and Brandeis University.  She teaches at Purdue University.

Awards
 1996 National Poetry Series, for Red Signature
 1997 The Chad Walsh Poetry Prize, by the Beloit Poetry Journal
 2001 Iowa Poetry Prize, for The Penultimate Suitor

Works
 "For the Love of Gerald Finzi"; "IT OPENS"; "WATER", Beloit Poetry Journal
 "Girl at Sewing Machine", Emory University

Anthologies

References

External links
The Writer's Almanac
An Interview with Mary Leader at Sycamore Review.

1948 births
Living people
American women poets
University of Oklahoma alumni